G protein-coupled receptor 1, also known as GPR1, is a protein that in humans is encoded by the GPR1 gene.

GPR1 is a member of the G protein-coupled receptor family of transmembrane receptors.  It functions as a receptor for chemerin.  Other receptors for chemerin include CMKLR1 and CCRL2.

References

Further reading

G protein-coupled receptors